This is a list of ecoregions in Panama as defined by the World Wildlife Fund and the Freshwater Ecoregions of the World database.

Tropical and subtropical moist broadleaf forests

 Chocó–Darién moist forests
 Eastern Panamanian montane forests
Isthmian-Atlantic moist forests
Isthmian-Pacific moist forests
Talamancan montane forests

Tropical and subtropical dry broadleaf forests

 Panamanian dry forests

Mangroves

Bocas del Toro–San Bastimentos Island–San Blas mangroves
 Gulf of Panama mangroves
Moist Pacific Coast mangroves

Freshwater ecoregions

Tropical and subtropical coastal rivers
 Chiriqui
 Isthmus Caribbean
 Santa Maria
 Chagres
 Rio Tuira

Marine ecoregions

Tropical Northwestern Atlantic
 Southwestern Caribbean

Tropical East Pacific
 Nicoya
 Panama Bight

References

 
Panama
Ecoregions